Dickens in America is a 2005 television documentary following Charles Dickens's travels across the United States in 1842, during which the young journalist penned a travel book, American Notes. It is hosted by British actress Miriam Margolyes, a lifelong fan of Dickens, and intersperses history with travelogue and interviews. It was produced by Lion Television Scotland for BBC Four. Nathaniel Parker provided the voice of Dickens, quoting from his texts throughout the journey.

Overview

Margolyes developed a love of Dickens' work when she was 11 years old and read Oliver Twist, and was inspired to create the series due to the small number of people who were familiar with American Notes. Margolyes received an Olivier Award nomination for her one-woman show Dickens' Women, in which she portrayed 23 characters from the novels and short stories. The show was originally devised for the 1989 Edinburgh Festival and Margolyes continued to reprise the role through to the Dickens bicentennial celebrations in 2012.

Dickens sailed for the United States on January 3, 1842, leaving Liverpool with his wife Catherine on board the steamship . During the five-month trip, Dickens travelled by ship, railway and stagecoach as far west as St. Louis and as far north as Quebec. He visited countless social institutions across all levels of society as well as making a specific trip to Richmond, Virginia to observe slavery firsthand, about which he wrote scathingly on his return to the United Kingdom.

Margolyes follows Dickens' route, leaving the UK on the Queen Mary 2, the contemporary equivalent flagship of the Cunard line, and wherever possible sleeping in the same inns and visiting the same sites that the author did. She traces both Dickens' own experiences as a travelling celebrity and the differences and similarities of the American culture which so shocked him. The series has been reviewed as being "far from... a critical academic analysis of Dickens' narrative of his 1842 journey" but as a work designed to bring viewers closer to the author with the aid of Margolyes' "subjective opinions".

Home media

The DVD of the series was released in North America on 1 March 2011.

Episodes

References

External links
 
https://web.archive.org/web/20110131215635/http://www.liontv.com/Scotland/Productions/Dickens-In-America Series' page on Lion Television's website

Works about Charles Dickens
Works about the United States
BBC television documentaries about history during the 18th and 19th centuries